Znamenka is a rural locality (a selo) and the administrative center of Znamensky Selsoviet of Romnensky District, Amur Oblast, Russia. The population was 421 as of 2018. There are 3 streets.

Geography 
Znamenka is located on the right bank of the Belaya River, 24 km southwest of Romny (the district's administrative centre) by road. Svyatorussovka is the nearest rural locality.

References 

Rural localities in Romnensky District